The Khemchik (Xemçik) is a river in Tuva in Russia, a left tributary of the Yenisey. The length of the river is 320 km, the area of its drainage basin is 27,000 km². The Khemchik freezes up in November and remains icebound until late April - early May. Its main tributaries are the Alash and Ak-Sug from the left, and the Barlyk and Chadan from the right. The town Ak-Dovurak is located in the valley of the Khemchik.

See also
List of rivers of Russia

References 

Rivers of Tuva